Indigo Traveller is the brand of New Zealand travel documentary filmmaker Nick Fisher. His travel films are posted to YouTube and feature trips to North Korea, Somalia, Venezuela, Ukraine, Yemen, Brazil, Nigeria, and Haiti. Fisher was 26 in 2018. He is one of the best known travel video bloggers in the world. He has about 1.8 million subscribers to his YouTube channel.

He has travelled to areas considered dangerous. He is based in Hungary.

In 2020, he was touring Tripoli, Libya, when shooting broke out.

See also
Vice Media
Lonely Planet

References

Vlogs-related YouTube channels
English-language YouTube channels
Travelogues